Armando Diena (Turin, 8 April 1914 – July 1985) was an Italian professional football player.

His older brother Ferruccio Diena also played for Juventus. To distinguish them, Ferruccio was known as Diena I and Armando as Diena II.

Honours
 Serie A champion: 1934/35.

References

External links
Profile at Enciclopediadelcalcio.it

1914 births
1985 deaths
Italian footballers
Serie A players
Juventus F.C. players
Novara F.C. players
Association football midfielders